Karna Bahadur Thapa, a member of Communist Party of Nepal (Unified Marxist-Leninist), assumed the post of the Minister of Industry of Nepal on 25 February 2014 under Sushil Koirala-led government.

He is a member of 2nd Nepalese Constituent Assembly. He won Bajura–1 seat in the CA assembly in 2013. He is the chairman of Nepal Communist Party Sudurpaschim Pradesh Committee.

References

Communist Party of Nepal (Unified Marxist–Leninist) politicians
Living people
Year of birth missing (living people)
Government ministers of Nepal
Members of the 2nd Nepalese Constituent Assembly